The polar regions, also called the frigid zones or polar zones, of Earth are the regions of the planet that surround its geographical poles (the North and South Poles), lying within the polar circles. These high latitudes are dominated by floating sea ice covering much of the Arctic Ocean in the north, and by the Antarctic ice sheet on the continent of Antarctica and the Southern Ocean in the south.

Definitions
The Arctic has various definitions, including the region north of the Arctic Circle (currently Epoch 2010 at 66°33'44" N), or just the region north of 60° north latitude, or the region from the North Pole north to the timberline. The Antarctic is usually defined simply as south of 60° south latitude, or the continent of Antarctica. The 1959 Antarctic Treaty uses the former definition.

The two polar regions are distinguished from the other two climatic and biometric belts of Earth, a tropics belt near the equator, and two middle latitude regions located between the tropics and polar regions.

Climate

Polar regions receive less intense solar radiation than the other parts of Earth because the Sun's energy arrives at an oblique angle, spreading over a larger area, being less concentrated, and also travels a longer distance through the Earth's atmosphere in which it may be absorbed, scattered or reflected, which is the same thing that causes winters to be colder than the rest of the year except in tropical regions.

The axial tilt of the Earth has the most effect on climate of the polar regions due to its latitude. However, since the polar regions are the farthest from the equator, they receive the weakest solar radiation and are therefore generally frigid year round due to the earth's axial tilt of 23.5° not being enough to create a high maximum midday declination to sufficiently compensate the Sun's rays for the high latitude even in summer, except for relatively brief periods in peripheral areas near the polar circles. The large amount of ice and snow also reflects and weakens of what weak sunlight the polar regions receive further, contributing to the cold. Polar regions are characterized by extremely cold temperatures, heavy glaciation wherever there is sufficient precipitation to form permanent ice, short and still cold summers, and extreme variations in daylight hours, with twenty-four hours of daylight in summer, and complete darkness at mid-winter.

Circumpolar Arctic region

There are many settlements in Earth's north polar region. Countries with claims to Arctic regions are: the United States (Alaska), Canada (Yukon, the Northwest Territories and Nunavut), Denmark (Greenland), Norway, Finland, Sweden, Iceland, and Russia. Arctic circumpolar populations, though small, often share more in common with each other than with other populations within their national boundaries. As such, the northern polar region is diverse in human settlements and cultures.

Antarctica and the Southern sea

The southern polar region has no permanent human habitation as of now. McMurdo Station is the largest research station in Antarctica, run by the United States. Other notable stations include Palmer Station and Amundsen–Scott South Pole Station (United States), Esperanza Base and Marambio Base (Argentina), Scott Base (New Zealand), and Vostok Station (Russia).

While there are no indigenous human cultures, there is a complex ecosystem, especially along Antarctica's coastal zones.  Coastal upwelling provides abundant nutrients which feeds krill, a type of marine Crustacea, which in turn feeds a complex of living creatures from penguins to blue whales.

See also 
 Cryosphere
 Polar climate

References

Further reading
 Victor, Paul-Émile. Man and the Conquest of the Poles, trans. by Scott Sullivan. New York: Simon & Schuster, 1963.

External links 

 
 The Polar Regions
 International Polar Foundation
 Arctic Environmental Atlas (UNDP)
 Earth's Polar Regions on Windows to the Universe
 Arctic Studies Center, Smithsonian Institution
 Scott Polar Research Institute, University of Cambridge
 WWF:The Polar Regions
 World Environment Day 2007 "Melting Ice" image gallery at The Guardian
 Polar Discovery

 
Geography of Antarctica
Arctic Ocean
Geography of the Arctic
Articles containing video clips